The first season of the animated television series My Little Pony: Friendship Is Magic, developed by Lauren Faust, originally aired on The Hub in the United States. The series is based on Hasbro's My Little Pony line of toys and animated works and is often referred by collectors to be the fourth generation, or "G4", of the My Little Pony franchise. Season 1 of the series premiered on October 10, 2010 on The Hub, an American pay television channel partly owned by Hasbro, and concluded on May 6, 2011.

The show follows a studious unicorn pony named Twilight Sparkle as her mentor Princess Celestia guides her to learn about friendship in the town of Ponyville. Twilight becomes close friends with five other ponies: Applejack, Rarity, Fluttershy, Rainbow Dash, and Pinkie Pie, as they all teach each other the magic of friendship. Each of the ponies represent a different facet of friendship, and Twilight soon discovers herself to be a key part of the "Elements of Harmony", ancient artifacts with powerful magic properties. The ponies share adventures and help out the residents of Ponyville, while working out the troublesome moments in their own friendships.

Development
Hasbro selected animator Lauren Faust as the creative director and executive producer for the show. Faust sought to challenge the established "girly" nature of the existing My Little Pony line, creating more in-depth characters and adventurous settings, incorporating Hasbro's suggestions for E/I ("educational and informational") content and marketing of the toy line.

Cast

Main

 Tara Strong as Twilight Sparkle
 Rebecca Shoichet as Twilight Sparkle (singing voice)
 Tabitha St. Germain as Rarity
 Kazumi Evans as Rarity (singing voice)
 Ashleigh Ball as Applejack and Rainbow Dash
 Andrea Libman as Fluttershy and Pinkie Pie
 Shannon Chan-Kent as Pinkie Pie (singing voice)
 Cathy Weseluck as Spike

Recurring
 Nicole Oliver as Princess Celestia
 The Cutie Mark Crusaders
 Michelle Creber as Apple Bloom
 Madeleine Peters as Scootaloo
 Claire Corlett as Sweetie Belle
 Michelle Creber as Sweetie Belle (singing voice)

Minor

 Peter New as Big McIntosh
 Tabitha St. Germain as Princess Luna/Nightmare Moon, Granny Smith, Mrs. Cake, and Photo Finish
 Kelly Metzger as Spitfire
 Matt Hill as Soarin
 Cathy Weseluck as Mayor Mare and Golden Harvest
 Nicole Oliver as Cheerilee
 Brian Drummond as Mr. Cake
 Chantal Strand as Diamond Tiara and Bon Bon
 Shannon Chan-Kent as Silver Spoon
 Brenda Crichlow as Zecora
 Richard Ian Cox as Snails
 Lee Tockar as Snips

Guest stars

 Lee Tockar as Steven Magnet
 Maryke Hendrikse as Gilda
 Kathleen Barr as Trixie and Hoops
 Blu Mankuma as "Flutterguy"
 Trevor Devall as Hoity Toity
 Rena Anakwe as Sapphire Shores
 The Diamond Dogs
 Scott McNeil as Rover
 Garry Chalk as Fido
 Lee Tockar as Spot
 Michael Daingerfield Hall as Braeburn
 Erin Mathews as Little Strongheart
 Scott McNeil as Chief Thunderhooves
 Vincent Tong as Pony Joe and Prince Blueblood
 James Wootton as Mule

Episodes

Songs

DVD release

Notes

References
 Song credits: 

1
2010 American television seasons
2011 American television seasons
2010 Canadian television seasons
2011 Canadian television seasons